Mary Smith Jones (July 24, 1819 – December 31, 1907) was the last First Lady of the Republic of Texas, as wife of Anson Jones, the last president of the Republic. She was the first president of the newly founded Daughters of the Republic of Texas in 1891.

Early life
Mary Smith was born on July 24, 1819 to John McCutcheon Smith and his wife Sarah Pevehouse Smith, in Lawrence County, Arkansas. Her father died in 1833, and the family relocated to the Mexican state of  Coahuila y Tejas. Mary became part of a large family of step-siblings when her mother remarried to John Woodruff. Due to growing political tensions and subsequent military operations leading up to the Texas Revolution, the Woodruffs moved a number of times, finally settling in Houston. Mary's first husband at age 19 was a soldier named Hugh McCrory. The marriage was cut short by McCrory's untimely death in 1837.  He was buried at Founders Memorial Cemetery, and a cenotaph remains at this site for Mary Smith Jones as well.

Anson Jones
On May 17, 1840, Mary wed Austin physician Anson Jones, whom she had met when he rented a room at her mother's boarding house. The couple had three sons and one daughter: Samuel, Charles, Cromwell, and Sallie. Jones was well-traveled and at one point had lived in Venezuela. Prior to his marriage to Mary, he had held positions in both the private sector, and in the government of the Republic of Texas.  In 1844, Jones became the last President of the Republic of Texas, with Mary as the last First Lady. His opposition to annexation created a volatile climate, and some had pushed for his impeachment. When Texas was annexed in 1845, Jones retired to private life.  He suffered a debilitating accident a few years later.  Although he held false hopes that he would be elected to the United States Senate, he had become bitter.  Jones killed himself in 1858. Mary Smith Jones then moved with her children first to Galveston and then onto a farm in Harris County.

Final years
Mary Smith Jones became the first president of the Daughters of the Republic of Texas in 1891, and a member of the Texas State Historical Association. The suicide of Anson Jones left Mary and the children strapped for money, and forced to sell their land and home at Washington-on-the-Brazos. Ashbel Smith assisted the family with purchase of land near Galveston.  Mary also relied on Smith in 1860 to take a manuscript of her husband's Memoranda to New York for publication; all printed copies of the manuscript remained stored away and undistributed until 1929.

She spent her remaining years living with her children, and dealing with the financial issues of her husband's estate.  Mary Smith Jones never remarried. She died in 1907 and is buried next to Anson Jones at Glenwood Cemetery in Houston, Texas.

References

Sources 

 

1819 births
1907 deaths
Burials at Glenwood Cemetery (Houston, Texas)
First Ladies and Gentlemen of Texas
First Ladies of the Republic of Texas
History of women in Texas
People from Houston
People from Lawrence County, Arkansas
People from Washington-on-the-Brazos, Texas